Kevork Aslan was an Armenian engineer born in 1849 who graduated from École Centrale de Paris in 1872 and later became chief engineer in the Aydin province (Turkey). In 1909, he published a historical study of the Armenian people.

Books
 
 Armenia and the Armenians from the Earliest Times Until the Great War - (1409782565) (1914)

References

Armenian engineers
Living people
Year of birth missing (living people)
20th-century Armenian historians